The Calumet Shoreline is an ancient shoreline of Lake Michigan located in the Lake Michigan Basin. It can be clearly seen as a sand ridge along Ridge Road south of Chicago. Closer to the lake from the Calumet Shoreline, there are the Tolleston shorelines and farther from the lake  are the Glenwood Shoreline, the Tinley Moraine, and the Valparaiso Moraine. The shoreline is named after the Calumet Region of Northern Indiana.

Development
The Michigan Lobe of the continental glacier had been stagnant for years, forming the Glenwood Shoreline. Once again, it began a general retreat northwards. The melt waters which formed Glacial Lake Chicago, had more space in which to reside. Then it began to drop. It appears that the outlet to the Illinois River, was cutting downward, keeping pace with the lowering lake.

Features
Along much of the east and west shores the beach has been eroded by the lake. It takes its name from the Calumet River in northwestern Indiana where it is well preserved.

References

See also 
Ridge Road
Calumet Region
Geography of Indiana
-glacial feature from north to south of Lake Michigan
 Glenwood Shoreline
 Calumet Shoreline
 Tolleston Shoreline
 Tinley Moraine
 Valparaiso Moraine
 Kankakee Outwash Plain

Geological history of the Great Lakes
Glacial landforms
Lake Michigan